"Second Solution" / "Prisoner of Society" is the third EP by Australian rock band The Living End. It was the best selling Australian single of the 1990s, and spent a record-breaking 69 weeks on the ARIA Top 100 singles chart. It provided a breakthrough for the band, bringing them to the attention of the Australian rock scene. Boosted by the success of this EP, they subsequently went into the studio to record their debut full-length album, The Living End, on which they re-recorded both of the title songs.

Music videos

Prisoner of Society
The music clip for "Prisoner of Society" was released first and features the band simply playing the song in a schoolroom intercut with scenes of young people in the same classroom who are rebelliously presenting "essays" to the class (though the essays they're reading are the lyrics of the song).

Second Solution
Following the release of the video for "Prisoner of Society", the band filmed and released the follow-up with "Second Solution." This video uses live clips from old performances where they play the song and shows all three members play their respective instruments in tune to the song at the same time.

Track listing
All songs were written by Chris Cheney.
"Second Solution" – 3:09 
"Prisoner of Society" – 3:54 
"Prisoner on the Inside" – 2:28 (Cover of the theme song from Prisoner, originally by Lynne Hamilton)
"Misspent Youth" (Live) – 2:52 
"Strange" (Live) – 4:06

Personnel
Chris Cheney – guitars and vocals
Scott Owen – upright bass and backing vocals
Travis Demsey – drums and backing vocals

Charts

Weekly charts

Year-end charts

Certifications

References

External links
Prisoner of Society music video

1997 singles
ARIA Award-winning songs
The Living End albums